New Hampstead High School is a public secondary school in Bloomingdale, Georgia, United States. It serves grades 9-12 for the Savannah-Chatham County Public Schools.

References

External links
 

Public high schools in Georgia (U.S. state)
Schools in Chatham County, Georgia